Andrew Scott may refer to:

Musicians
 Andy Scott (guitarist) (born 1949), British guitarist with glam rock band Sweet
 Andy Scott (saxophonist and composer) (born 1966), British saxophonist and composer
 Andy Scott (musician) (born 1966), former drummer with The Tickets, Wasted Youth and The Cockney Rejects
 Andrew Scott (drummer) (born 1967), drummer for the Canadian rock group Sloan
 Andrew Scott (Canadian musician, born 1979), alternative folk singer and songwriter
 Andrew Scott (Canadian jazz guitarist), Toronto-based jazz guitarist

Sportspeople
 Andrew Scott (golfer) (born c. 1870), Scottish professional golfer
 Andrew Scott (Australian footballer) (born 1952), Hawthorn VFL footballer
 Andrew Scott (cricketer) (1960–2006), Australian cricketer
 Andrew Scott (baseball) (born 1969), Australian baseball player
 Andy Scott (footballer, born 1972), English footballer whose clubs included Sheffield United, Brentford and Leyton Orient
 Andy Scott (footballer, born 1975), English football full back
 Andy Scott (Scottish footballer) (born 1985), Scottish footballer who currently plays for Alloa Athletic
 Andrew Scott (Northern Irish footballer) (born 2000), footballer for Larne

Others
 Andrew Scott (bishop) (1772–1846), Roman Catholic Bishop of Glasgow
 Andrew Scott (judge) (1789–1851), U.S. lawyer, judge in the Arkansas Territory
 Andrew Scott (VC) (1840–1882), British soldier, won the Victoria Cross, 1877
 Captain Moonlite (Andrew George Scott, 1842–1880), Australian bushranger
 Andrea Scotti (born 1931), credit as Andrew Scott, Italian actor
 Andrew Cunningham Scott (born 1952), British geologist
 Andrew Murray Scott (born 1955), Scottish novelist, poet and non-fiction book writer
 Andy Scott (politician) (1955–2013), Liberal Member of the Canadian Parliament
 Andrew Scott (museum director) (born 1958), British museum director
 Andy Scott (sculptor) (born 1964), Scottish figurative sculptor
 Andrew J Scott (born 1965), British economist
 Andrew Scott (actor) (born 1976), Irish film, television and stage actor
 Drew Scott (born 1978), star of Property Brothers
 Andy Scott (entrepreneur) (born 1979), British multi-millionaire entrepreneur and businessman
 Andrew Scott (GR13), a character in the 1992 film Universal Soldier

See also
 Andrew Gilbert-Scott (born 1958), former British racing driver